Brazil debuted in the OTI Festival in the first edition which was held in Madrid in 1972 and participated in the event intermittently from the start of the event until 1984. Rede Globo withdrew from the event in 1985 and 1986 and returned in 1987. Brazil withdrew again from 1988 to 1992. One year later, the Brazilian broadcaster made a brief return to the event until 1995. From 1996 on, Brazil retired definitively from the event.

History 
The Brazilian OTI contestants were internally selected by Rede Globo. Brazil was one of the most successful participating countries in the festival with three victories: The first of those victories came in 1972 in the first edition of the festival with Cláudia Regina and Tobias. The second Brazilian victory came in 1978 in Santiago de Chile with the female singer Denise de Kalafe and her song "El amor... cosa tan rara" (Love... such a strange thing), which was performed in Spanish. The third and last victory of Brazil in the OTI Festival took place in Washington DC 1983 with Jessé and his song "Estrela de papel" (Paper star). In total, the Brazilian broadcaster, Rede Globo managed to reach ten times to the top 10.

Brazil hosted the OTI Festival in 1973, after winning the song contest the previous year, according to the original rules. The festival was held in the "Palacio das Artes" in Belo Horizonte. The stage of the festival had soft colors, a background zone for the orchestra and a central platform where the performers competed and the event was presented by Iris Lettieri and Walter Forster. This event wasn't organized by Rede Globo, but by Rede Tupi, through its local TV station TV Itacolomi - Canal 4 of Belo Horizonte.

Contestants 
Denisse de Kalafe, participated in the event for first time in 1976 getting the fourth place. Two years later, the singer returned to the event and got the second Brazilian victory in the OTI Festival.
Table key

Hostings

References 

OTI Festival
Brazilian music
TV Globo